Rodeo clown generally refers to a rodeo performer who protects competitors in bull riding from being injured by the bulls.

The term may also refer to:

"Rodeo Clown", a song by John Mellencamp from Freedom's Road
"Rodeo Clowns", a song by Jack Johnson, available on the album On and On or as an earlier collaboration with G. Love and Special Sauce on Philadelphonic

See also
 Clown (disambiguation)
 Rodeo (disambiguation)